The Belaya is a river in Bashkortostan, Russian Federation. Its source lies in the south-western Ural Mountains.

Settlements along the Belaya include Beloretsk, Sterlitamak, Ufa (at the confluence with the river Ufa), and Birsk. The Belaya flows into the Kama near Neftekamsk.

Tributaries

The largest tributaries of the Belaya are, from source to mouth:

 Tirlyan (right)
 Nugush (right)
 Ashkadar (left)
 Kuganak (left)
 Zigan (right)
 Zilim (right)
 Sim (right)
 Urshak (left)
 Ufa (right)
 Dyoma (left)
 Chermasan (left)
 Bir (right)
 Bystry Tanyp (right)
 Baza (left)
 Syun (left)

See also
List of rivers of Russia
Nakas (mountain)

References

Gallery 

Rivers of Bashkortostan